The name Senthil has the following meanings:

Senthil, a slapstick comedy film actor from the Tamil Nadu state of India
K. K. Senthil Kumar, cinematographer in the Telugu film industry
One of the names of the Hindu deity Murugan, popularly worshipped by the Tamil speaking Hindus who live predominantly in the state of Tamil Nadu, India. Murugan is better known in other parts of India as Karthikeya or Subramanya